R324 road may refer to:
 R324 road (Ireland)
 R324 road (South Africa)